The Peerage of Scotland is one of the five divisions of peerages in the United Kingdom and for those peers created by the King of Scots before 1707. Following that year's Treaty of Union, the Kingdom of Scots and the Kingdom of England were combined under the name of Great Britain, and a new Peerage of Great Britain was introduced in which subsequent titles were created.

Scottish Peers were entitled to sit in the ancient Parliament of Scotland. After the Union, the Peers of the old Parliament of Scotland elected 16 representative peers to sit in the House of Lords at Westminster. The Peerage Act 1963 granted all Scottish Peers the right to sit in the House of Lords, but this automatic right was revoked, as for all hereditary peerages (except those of the incumbent Earl Marshal and Lord Great Chamberlain), when the House of Lords Act 1999 received the Royal Assent.

Unlike most peerages, many Scottish titles have been granted with remainder to pass via female offspring (thus an Italian family has succeeded to and presently holds the earldom of Newburgh), and in the case of daughters only, these titles devolve to the eldest daughter rather than falling into abeyance (as is the case with ancient English baronies by writ of summons). Unlike other British peerage titles, Scots law permits peerages to be inherited by or through a person who was not legitimate at birth, but was subsequently legitimised by their parents marrying later.

The ranks of the Scottish Peerage are, in ascending order: Lord of Parliament, Viscount, Earl, Marquis and Duke. Scottish Viscounts differ from those of the other Peerages (of England, Great Britain, Ireland and the United Kingdom) by using the style of in their title, as in Viscount of Oxfuird. Though this is the theoretical form, most Viscounts drop the "of". The Viscount of Arbuthnott and to a lesser extent the Viscount of Oxfuird still use "of". 

Scottish Barons rank below Lords of Parliament, and although considered noble, their titles are incorporeal hereditaments. At one time feudal barons did sit in parliament. However, they are considered minor barons and not peers because their titles can be hereditary, or bought and sold.

In the following table of the Peerage of Scotland as it currently stands, each peer's highest ranking title in the other peerages (if any) are also listed. Those peers who are known by a higher title in one of the other peerages are listed in italics.

Dukes

Marquesses

Earls and countesses

Viscounts

Lords of Parliament

See also 

 The Scots Peerage, nine-volume book series 
 Barons in Scotland
 Noblesse
 Peerage of England
 Welsh peers and baronets
 Peerage of Ireland
 History of the Peerage

References

External links

 BurkesPeerage.com

 
Scottish society
Scotland
Lists of Scottish people
European peerage
Parliament of Scotland